Absolutely Live may refer to:
 Absolutely Live (The Doors album)
 Absolutely Live (Rod Stewart album)
 Absolutely Live (Toto album)